Dr Heli Simpson (born 21 February 1987) is an Australian actress, singer, dancer, equestrian, comedian, and doctor. She is best known for her role as Veronica DiAngelo #1 on The Saddle Club. In 2005, Simpson was selected for the Australian team for the International Biology Olympiad in Beijing, winning a bronze medal.

Biography
Simpson was born in Melbourne, and was raised by her English father and Estonian mother with two brothers. Her first acting role was as Veronica DiAngelo #1 in the popular 2001 TV series The Saddle Club Don't Ask Me, was released as Simpson's debut single in 2004, which peaked at #16 on the Australian Recording Industry Association (ARIA) singles chart. It was followed by her only album, Princess Veronica and her EP Princess Veronica Tour EP. Simpson and her former co-star Kia Luby are featured on the original soundtracks for The Saddle Club.

Simpson graduated from Lauriston Girls' School in 2005. At the beginning of 2006, she attended the National Science Olympiad in Canberra. During her Victorian Certificate of Education (VCE) studies, she achieved the maximum percentile ranking of 99.95.  She received a MBBS degree at the University of Melbourne. Heli is a doctor at Mercy Hospital for Women in Melbourne, Victoria, Australia. Heli Simpson is currently a member of the comedy team Boss Octopus. When she was in her 20s Heli worked as a house sitter with Midahome Australia.

Credits

Television

Stage

Discography

Albums

Extended plays
 Princess Veronica Tour EP (2004)

Singles

References

External links
 
 Boss Octopus

1987 births
Living people
Australian biologists
Australian child actresses
Australian television actresses
People from Melbourne
Australian expatriates in France
21st-century Australian singers
21st-century Australian women singers
People educated at Lauriston Girls' School